The 1996 Irish Masters was the twenty-second edition of the professional invitational snooker tournament, which took place from 26 to 31 March 1996. The tournament was played at Goffs in Kill, County Kildare, and featured twelve professional players.

Darren Morgan won the title for the first time, beating Steve Davis 9–8 in the final.

Main draw

References

Irish Masters
Irish Masters
Irish Masters
Irish Masters